East Hope is a city in Bonner County, Idaho, United States. The population was 210 at the 2010 census.

Geography
East Hope is located at  (48.241882, -116.294925).

Demographics

2010 census
At the 2010 census, there were 210 people, 109 households and 64 families living in the city. The racial makeup was 98.1% White, 0.5% Native American, 0.5% Asian, 0.5% Pacific Islander, and 0.5% from other races. Hispanic or Latino of any race were 2.4% of the population.

There were 109 households, of which 13.8% had children under the age of 18 living with them, 55.0% were married couples living together, 3.7% had a female householder with no husband present, and 41.3% were non-families. 34.9% of all households were made up of individuals, and 21.1% had someone living alone who was 65 years of age or older. The average household size was 1.93 and the average family size was 2.42.

The median age was 58.5 years. 12.4% of residents were under the age of 18; 1.8% were between the ages of 18 and 24; 16.2% were from 25 to 44; 39.6% were from 45 to 64; and 30% were 65 years of age or older. The gender makeup was 48.1% male and 51.9% female.

2000 census
At the 2000 census, there were 200 people, 104 households and 68 families living in the city. The racial makeup of the city was 98.50% White, 0.50% Native American, 0.50% Asian, and 0.50% from two or more races. Hispanic or Latino of any race were 0.50% of the population.

There were 104 households, of which 9.6% had children under the age of 18 living with them, 63.5% were married couples living together, 2.9% had a female householder with no husband present, and 33.7% were non-families. 29.8% of all households were made up of individuals, and 11.5% had someone living alone who was 65 years of age or older. The average household size was 1.92 and the average family size was 2.33.

10.5% of the population were under the age of 18, 2.5% from 18 to 24, 14.0% from 25 to 44, 31.0% from 45 to 64, and 42.0% who were 65 years of age or older.  The median age was 58 years. For every 100 females, there were 112.8 males. For every 100 females age 18 and over, there were 105.7 males.

The median household income was $30,417 and the median family income was $37,500. Males had a median income of $35,938 and females $21,667. The per capita income was $18,184. About 3.2% of families and 7.1% of the population were below the poverty line, including none of those under the age of eighteen and 12.3% of those 65 or over.

See also
 List of cities in Idaho

References

External links

Cities in Bonner County, Idaho
Cities in Idaho